The Silver Condor Award for Best First Film , given by the Argentine Film Critics Association, awards the best first film each year.

Películas

References 

Argentine Film Critics Association
Directorial debut film awards